Twilight Zone may refer to:

Arts and entertainment

The Twilight Zone franchise

The Twilight Zone, an American media franchise 
The Twilight Zone (1959 TV series), the original TV series by Rod Serling
The Twilight Zone (1985 TV series), a revival of the original series
The Twilight Zone (2002 TV series), a revival of the original  series
The Twilight Zone (2019 TV series), a revival of the original series
The Twilight Zone (radio series), a 2002 radio adaptation of the original series
Twilight Zone: The Movie, a 1983 film based on the original series 
Twilight Zone: Rod Serling's Lost Classics, a 1994 TV film
Twilight Zone (pinball), a 1993 Midway pinball game
Twilight Zone: 19 Original Stories on the 50th Anniversary, a 2009 short story anthology

Music
"Twilight Zone" (Golden Earring song), 1982
"Twilight Zone" (Iron Maiden song), 1981
"Twilight Zone" (2 Unlimited song), 1992
"The Twilight Zone" (Rush song), 1976
"Twilight Zone", a song by L.A. style from the 1993 album L.A. Style
"Twilight Zone/Twilight Tone", a song by The Manhattan Transfer from the 1979 album Extensions
"Twilight Zone", a song by Average White Band from the 1973 album Show Your Hand
"Twilight Zone", a song by Van Morrison from the 1998 album The Philosopher's Stone
"Twilight Zone", a song by John Cale from the 2003 album HoboSapiens
"Twilight Zone", a song by S.E.S. from the 1999 album Love

Science
Terminator (solar), or twilight zone, a moving line that divides the daylit side and the dark night side of a planetary body
Mesopelagic zone, or twilight zone, at a depth of 200–1000m below the ocean surface

Other uses
Twilight Zone, a nightclub in Toronto Entertainment District, Canada
An area in Chicago inhabited by members of the Maniac Latin Disciples gang

See also